Teri Wyble is an American actress who has appeared in the AMC drama The Walking Dead as Officer Shepherd and in Terminator Genisys as the human resistance soldier Mariam. She was born in Arnaudville, Louisiana, the youngest of five children.

Career 
Wyble graduated with a BFA in Dance from the University of Louisiana at Lafayette. She moved to New Orleans to begin her acting career in Louisiana. She landed her first on-screen role as Dominic Cooper's character's doomed wife in Abraham Lincoln: Vampire Hunter. Wyble traveled to Seeboden, Austria where she was awarded Model of the Year at the 2010 World Bodypainting Festival. Wyble appeared on the AMC drama The Walking Dead as a character named Officer Shepherd, and in the film Terminator Genisys as a character named Mariam.

Filmography

Film

Television

References

External links 

Living people
American film actresses
University of Louisiana at Lafayette alumni
Year of birth missing (living people)
21st-century American actresses
Actresses from Louisiana
People from Arnaudville, Louisiana